Sylvie Sabas-Legris (born 19 February 1972) is a French former professional tennis player.

Sabas was the 16 and under Orange Bowl champion in 1988. On the professional tour she reached a best singles ranking of 152 in the world. She featured twice in the French Open main draw for singles and made six main draw appearances in doubles. She now works as a sophrologist and is based in Nantes.

ITF finals

Singles (2–1)

Doubles (1–1)

References

External links
 
 

1972 births
Living people
French female tennis players